Karnataka Southern Diocese  is one of the twenty-two dioceses of the Church of South India covering the southern part of Karnataka. The other Church of South India dioceses in Karnataka are Karnataka Northern Diocese and Central Karnataka Diocese.

History
Karnataka Southern Diocese of Church of South India was formed on 1 May 1970 by the bifurcation of then Mysore diocese.

About
The diocese covers 10 districts and consists of 82 churches. The areas which comes under Karnataka southern diocese are Dakshina Kannada, Udupi, Kodagu, Chikmagalur, Hassan, Mandya, Mysore, Chamarajanagar, Kasaragod and Talavady Firkha (Tamil Nadu).

Bishops
Erstwhile Mysore Diocese 
 Premaka Gurushantha (1947-1951) 
 Norman C. Sargant (1951-1971)
Karnataka Southern Diocese
 1970-1978, S. R. Furtado,
 1989-1997, D. P. Shettian
 1997-2004, C. L. Furtado,
 2004-2009, Devaraj Bangera,
 2009-2013, John S. Sadananda,
 2013-2021, Mohan Manoraj
 2022- Present, Rt Rev Hemachandra Kumar

Notable churches
 Shanthi Cathedral, Balmatta, Mangalore
On 30 October 1834, Rev J C Lehner, Rev C L Grainer and Rev Samuel Hebich established the first station of the Basel Mission in a rented house obtained from a Parsi family in Mission Street which was then known as Neereshwalya. The Collector of Mangalore at that time, H M Blair, bought a plot at what was then known as ‘Belmount’ and handed it over to the Basel Mission free of cost. On 11 December 1862, the new church building was consecrated and named the Shanthi Church. By virtue of its strategic location in the Southern Diocese, the Shanthi Church was elevated to the status of Cathedral in the year 1970.
 C.S.I Sawday Memorial Church, Mandya
The church is dedicated in memory of George William Sawday, a missionary born in England who arrived in Mysore in 1880 and did community service for 64 years till his death in 1944. The Sadway Memorial Church is situated in Mandya.
 St. Bartholomew's Church, Mysore

The site for the St. Bartholomew's Church was a gift from the Maharaja of Mysore, Krishnaraja Wodeyar III (1799-1868), and it was consecrated in 1830. The church was constructed in 1832 with contributions from military officers and civilians. In 1847, the church was affiliated to the Anglican denomination and handed over to the Madras Government in 1852.
 St. Paul’s Church, Mangalore

St. Paul’s Church is located at the NW corner of the Central Maidan (now renamed Nehru Maidan), in Mangalore, India. St. Paul's is the very first Protestant church to be raised in the South Kanara region, and the first vertical building to be constructed at the Central Maidan. St. Paul's was originally a garrison church, raised by the British India army of the Madras Government, built using prison labour. St. Paul's is an imposing structure amidst the chaos of the fish market, service bus stand, and the State Bank of India.

Institutions

CSI Holdsworth Memorial Hospital (Mission Hospital), Mandi Mohalla, Mysore
The Hospital is founded by the Wesleyan Missionaries from UK in 1906. Currently it is a 300 bed multi specialty hospital.

Educational Institutions under the Diocese
Primary Schools -43
Nursing Schools-30
High Schools-6
Junior Colleges-3
Vocational Institutions-10
Technical Institutions-1

References

See also
Church of South India
Karnataka Northern Diocese
Central Karnataka Diocese

Southern Karnataka
Christianity in Karnataka